Teardrop Pond is a meltwater pond 1 nautical mile (1.9 km) southwest of Greegor Peak in the Denfeld Mountains of the Ford Ranges in Marie Byrd Land. Mapped by United States Geological Survey (USGS) from surveys and U.S. Navy air photos, 1959–65. The descriptive name, applied by Advisory Committee on Antarctic Names (US-ACAN), is suggestive of the shape of the feature in plan view.

Lakes of Antarctica
Bodies of water of Marie Byrd Land